Moubray Bay is a bay in the western Ross Sea, indenting the coast of Victoria Land, Antarctica, between Cape Roget and Cape Hallett. It was discovered in 1841 by Sir James Clark Ross and named by him for George H. Moubray, clerk in charge of the expedition ship .

References

Bays of Victoria Land
Borchgrevink Coast